Monty Python and the Holy Grail (Book), also known as Mønti Pythøn ik den Hølie Gräilen (Bøk), is the literary companion to the 1975 film of the same name, assembled by co-director Terry Jones.

Released in 1977, the main body of the book is the final draft of the screenplay, complete with sections that were cut from the final film scribbled out. Also included is the first draft, much of which bears little resemblance to the final product and parts of which ended up in the fourth series of Monty Python, following John Cleese's departure. Many photographs and Terry Gilliam sketches appear throughout the book.

The original release was issued in a plain black cover bearing the title and a cut out window revealing the typeface of the first draft. Subsequent reprints have used a different design, losing the cut out window and adding stills from the film.

Contents
Monty Python's Second Film (First Draft)
A Letter to Michael Palin From the Producer 
Trailer Script/Lobby Cards
Monty Python and the Holy Grail - Final Draft 
Statement of Financial Position and Cost of Production Statement

Credits
 Authors - Graham Chapman, John Cleese, Terry Gilliam, Eric Idle, Terry Jones, Michael Palin
 Editor - Terry Jones
 Designer - Derek Birdsall
 Photography - Drew Mara

References

Monty Python and the Holy Grail
Monty Python literature
Methuen Publishing books
1977 books